"Meditations in an Emergency" is the final episode in the second season of the American television show Mad Men. This episode was written by Matthew Weiner, Kater Gordon and Robin Veith and directed by Matthew Weiner. The episode originally aired October 26, 2008, on the AMC network.

Plot 
Betty visits the doctor where she learns she is pregnant. She tries to broach the subject of abortion, but the doctor insists that is only for single girls, not wealthy, married women. Don returns from California and visits her at the stables. The two talk and he finally confirms that he did in fact have an affair. Betty rejects any further attempts at reconciliation, telling him they'll talk later.

Harry, Ken, Paul, and Salvatore wonder why they are suddenly being asked to provide detailed department information to Bert Cooper. They convince Lois, Don's former secretary who now works as a switch operator, to reveal what she has overheard. She divulges that Sterling Cooper is being bought and merged with the British ad agency Putnam, Powell, and Lowe (PPL), and, that while they are interested in retaining the New York office, it is possible that some employees will be let go. The men become concerned for their job security.

Pete is encouraged by Peggy to admit that Clearasil is leaving the agency. Duck is surprisingly unperturbed and informs Pete that he intends to make Pete head of accounting while he himself is going to be the new head of Sterling Cooper.

Everyone is put on edge by the escalating Cuban missile crisis. Joan broaches the subject of a civil safety protocol while Trudy decides to flee Manhattan to stay with her parents in case of an attack. Pete refuses to go with her, despite her pleading. Father Gill discusses the possibility of nuclear war in his sermon, and, the next day, approaches Peggy to discuss it further. He expresses the belief that he was sent to Brooklyn specifically to help Peggy, and encourages her to confess the birth of her child to him. He warns her that if she does not repent and they are bombed, she will go to hell. Offended, Peggy dismisses him and states that, "she doesn't believe that's the way God is."

Don returns after his three week hiatus and learns of Peggy's new office as well as the merger. He goes mostly unpunished for his disappearance, though Pete Campbell rebukes him for leaving him to deal with the clients by himself in California. Don tells Pete he had faith in his abilities, and that now Pete is worthy of the promotion he desperately wanted last season. Moved by his loyalty to Don, Pete reveals to him that Duck will be made president of Sterling Cooper. 

Betty discloses to Francine that she is pregnant, but does not want to have a baby. Sympathetic, Francine mentions it is possible to have a secret abortion in Albany or Puerto Rico- though the latter option is not ideal due to the situation in Cuba. That night, Betty drops Sally and Bobby off to stay with Don, while she has the night to herself. She goes shopping and stops for a drink at a bar where she engages in a sexual encounter with a stranger in the back room. Don, meanwhile, sits with Sally and Bobby and begins drafting a letter to Betty. 

The next day, Bert, Roger, Don, and Duck meet with the executives from the PPL, and Duck is announced as the new president of Sterling Cooper. Duck declares his business strategy to be focused on simply pushing advertisements and dismisses the actual importance or persuasive abilities of the creative department. Disagreeing with this plan, Don reveals he intends to resign from Sterling Cooper. Duck attempts to threaten him by mentioning his contract, but Don reminds everyone that he does not have a contract and walks out. Infuriated, Duck states that they do not need Don, but the PPL executives are unconvinced. They ask Duck to step out of the room, and remark to Roger and Bert that Duck, "never could hold his liquor." 

While on her way out, Pete calls Peggy into his office. The two begin talking and Pete confesses his love for Peggy and that he wants to be with her. Shocked and frustrated by the revelation, Peggy finally informs Pete that she could have shamed him into being with her because of her pregnancy. She explains clearly that "she had his baby, but she gave it away." Astonished, Pete questions why she would choose to tell him this now. She clarifies that she did not want to be with him, and that she thought there was a part of herself she could get back by pretending that it never happened, but now she knows that that person is gone. She apologizes to him and leaves while Pete sits stunned. 

Betty finds the letter from Don where he expresses his regret for cheating on her, his desire to be a family, and that without her, he will be alone forever. She allows him to move back home. When he returns, the two sit together in the kitchen, and Betty reveals she is pregnant. Surprised, Don reaches out and takes her hand. The two sit and stare at each other in contemplative silence.

Production 
"Meditations in an Emergency" was directed and written by Matthew Weiner and written by Kater Gordon and Robin Veith

Matthew Weiner centered this episode around the crisis of the Cuban Missile Crisis. The possibility of nuclear doom weighs heavy on the show's characters, in part because it parallels the psychological crisis each is experiencing, most notably Don's return home and the effects of that on the Draper family and the pregnancy Betty is struggling with. Another crisis is Peggy’s agony of mind over having given birth to Pete’s child yet not revealing that to him. A third crisis is triggered by Sterling Cooper's merger with PPL. “This was an opportunity to show that in a crisis it can be an excuse to behave badly," said Weiner, "but it can also be a moment to face the truth.”

Reception 
This episode is rated 9 out of 10 stars by users of all demographics on IMDb.

References

External links 
 

M
M